Antonio Greco (born 17 September 1923, date of death unknown) was a Bolivian footballer who played as a defender.

Biography
Greco was born in La Paz on 17 September 1923. He played for Bolivia in the 1950 FIFA World Cup. He also played for Club Litoral. Some sources mention Greco as born in Argentina. Greco is deceased.

References

External links

FIFA profile

1923 births
Year of death missing
Footballers from La Paz
Bolivian footballers
Bolivia international footballers
Association football defenders
Club Deportivo Litoral (Cochabamba) players
1950 FIFA World Cup players